"Mack the Knife" is a song composed by Kurt Weill with lyrics by Bertolt Brecht for their music drama The Threepenny Opera.

Mack the Knife may also refer to:
 Mack the Knife (1989 film), a 1989 Netherlands romantic comedy musical film
 Mack the Knife (1995 film), a 1995 Hong Kong comedy-drama film
Ella in Berlin: Mack the Knife, a 1960 live album by Ella Fitzgerald, containing her famous version of the song with improvised lyrics

People 
Georges Leekens (born 1949), Belgian football manager and former player whose nickname is Mack the Knife (or Long couteau in French)
Mac the Knife, computer columnist
John J. Mack (born 1944), former CEO of Credit Suisse First Boston
Harold Macmillan (1894–1986), known as "Mac the Knife", former British Prime Minister
Robert McNamara (1916–2009), also known as "Mac the Knife", former U.S. Secretary of Defense
Mack "The Knife" Pride, brother of country singer Charley Pride

Other uses 
Mac Tonight, a McDonald's mascot who performs a version of Mack the Knife
Mack the Knife, a fictional character from Captain Commando
Mack the Knife, a fictional character from Super Mario RPG
MTK Global, boxing management company